The Military ranks of Egypt are the military insignia used by the Egyptian Armed Forces. Egypt has a uniform system similar to the United Kingdom, with rank insignia being similar across the different services.

Commissioned officer ranks
The rank insignia of commissioned officers.

Other ranks
The rank insignia of non-commissioned officers and enlisted personnel.

History

The Egyptian military ranks were changed after the revolution of 1952 and the fall of the monarchy. In the year 1958 the crown was replaced by the Eagle of Saladin (also known as "The Egyptian Eagle"; "Ancient Egyptian Eagle", and is the new coat of arms) and formal-Arabic language ranks.

References

External links
 

Army
Egyptian military personnel
Navy
Egyptian Navy
Air Force
Egyptian Air Force
Air force ranks
Ranks